Batman railway station is located on the Upfield line in Victoria, Australia. It serves the northern Melbourne suburb of Coburg North, and it opened on 8 October 1889 as Bell Park. It closed on 13 July 1903, and reopened again on 1 October 1914 as Batman.

History

Batman station opened on 8 October 1889, when the railway line was extended from Coburg to Somerton. It was named after one of the founders of Melbourne, John Batman.

In 1959, the current island platform was provided, when the line was duplicated between Coburg and Fawkner.

In 1920, a siding that once existing for the former Lincoln Mills knitting works on Gaffney Street was provided, and was abolished in 1970, along with the associated signal discs and posts.

In 1982, a crossover at the station was abolished, along with a number of signals and levers.

A disused signal box is located at the Up end of the station, which was provided in 1935, along with interlocked gates at the Gaffney Street level crossing. In the late 1990s, the gates were replaced with boom barriers, when the Upfield line was upgraded.

Platforms and services

Batman has one island platform with two faces. It is serviced by Metro Trains' Upfield line services.

Platform 1:
  all stations services to Flinders Street

Platform 2:
  all stations services to Upfield

Transport links

Broadmeadows Bus Service operates one route via Batman station, under contract to Public Transport Victoria:
 : Campbellfield Plaza Shopping Centre – Coburg

Dysons operates one route via Batman station, under contract to Public Transport Victoria:
 : Glenroy station – Coburg

Yarra Trams operates one route via Batman station:
 : North Coburg – Flinders Street station (Elizabeth Street Melbourne CBD)

References

External links
 Melway map at street-directory.com.au

Railway stations in Melbourne
Railway stations in Australia opened in 1889
Railway stations in the City of Merri-bek